Huixin Xijie Nankou station is a station on Line 5 and Line 10 of the Beijing Subway. The station handled a peak passenger traffic of 241,700 people on May 5, 2013.

The two parts of the stop opened separately: Line 5 and part of the concourse opened October 7, 2007, while the rest opened along with Line 10 on July 19, 2008.

Station layout 
Both the line 5 and 10 stations are underground. The line 5 station has an island platform, while the line 10 station has 2 side platforms.

Exits 
There are 4 exits, lettered A, B, C, and D. Exits B and C are accessible.

Accidents 
On November 6, 2014, a woman was killed when she tried to board the train at Huixinxijie Nankou Station on Beijing Subway's Line 5. She became trapped between the train door and the platform edge door and was crushed to death by the departing train. The accident happened on the second day of APEC China 2014 meetings in the city during which the municipal government has banned cars from the roads on alternate says to ease congestion and reduce pollution during the summit – measures which the capital's transport authorities have estimated would lead to an extra one million extra passengers on the subway every day.

References

External links
 

Beijing Subway stations in Chaoyang District
Railway stations in China opened in 2007